San Francisco Samba (subtitled Live at Keystone Korner) is a live album by saxophonist Art Pepper, recorded at the Keystone Korner in 1977 and released on the Contemporary label in 1997.

Reception

The AllMusic review by Cub Koda states: " Pepper may have been a tortured soul in his last half-decade, but he let all of his emotions come out through his horn. And his music was never more direct, honest and beautiful as a result of it". In JazzTimes Harvey Pekar was less complimentary stating "The CD consists of four long tracks, and on it Art's playing leaves plenty to be desired. He plays with plenty of heat, but doesn't connect his phrases or build, wandering all over the place, and doesn't display much imagination either. It's a shame because the rhythm section cooks like crazy" No music from this 1977 Keystone Corner engagement was ever released on LP

Track listing
All compositions by Art Pepper except as indicated
 "Blue Bossa" (Kenny Dorham) - 16:15 	
 "Art Meets Mr. Beautiful" - 12:10 	
 "Here's That Rainy Day" (Jimmy Van Heusen, Johnny Burke) - 11:35 	
 "Samba Mom Mom" - 11:27

Personnel
Art Pepper - alto saxophone
George Cables - piano
Michael Formanek - bass
Eddie Marshall - drums

References

Contemporary Records live albums
Art Pepper live albums
1997 live albums
Albums recorded at Keystone Korner